Ignatius John "Jack" O'Rourke (15 January 1899 – 13 May 1969) was an Australian rules footballer who played with St Kilda and Fitzroy in the Victorian Football League (VFL).

Family
One of the ten children of Joseph Francis O'Rourke (1868-1951), and Maria Mary "Polly" O'Rourke, née Dunne (1867-1933), Ignatius John O'Rourke was born at Cororooke, Victoria on 15 January 1899.

His brother, Frank O'Rourke, played for Carlton and Fitzroy. 

He married Beryl Josine Morden (1901-1996) in 1926. Both their sons, John Brian "Jack" O'Rourke (1928-2008) and Basil Joseph O'Rourke (1930-2017), played for Richmond in the VFL.

His brother-in-law, Jim Morden played for St Kilda, and another brother-in-law, Clem Morden, played for St Kilda and for Collingwood in the VFL.

Football

Horsham (WDFA)
He was granted a clearance to the Horsham Football Club in the Wimmera District Football Association in 1928.

Notes

References

External links 
 		
 
 Jack O'Rourke at The VFA Project.

1899 births
1969 deaths
Australian rules footballers from Victoria (Australia)
St Kilda Football Club players
Fitzroy Football Club players
Horsham Football Club players